Vladislav Mikhailovich Zakoptelov (born 26 June 1988) is a former Russian football striker.

Club career
He made his debut for the senior squad of FC Amkar Perm on 20 September 2006 in the Russian Cup game against FC Angusht Nazran.

References

External links
 
 

1988 births
Sportspeople from Perm, Russia
Living people
Russian footballers
Association football forwards
FC Amkar Perm players